Bea or BEA, as a name, abbreviation, or acronym, may refer to:

Companies and organisations

 Bank of East Asia
 BEA Systems, an American software company
 Belgian Entertainment Association, a music, video and video game industry organization
 British European Airways
 Broadcast Education Association, an international organization of media communication scholars
 Spanish Bank of Algae, a national research and development service

Government agencies
 British Electricity Authority
 Bureau d'Enquêtes et d'Analyses pour la Sécurité de l'Aviation Civile, the French agency responsible for investigating aviation accidents
 Bureau d'Enquête et d'Analyse pour la sécurité de l'aviation civile (Senegal), the Senegalese agency responsible for investigating aviation accidents
 Bureau of Economic Analysis, an agency of the United States Department of Commerce
 New Hampshire Department of Business and Economic Affairs, an agency of the U.S. state of New Hampshire

People
 Bea (given name)
 Bea (surname)

Arts, entertainment, and media
 Bea, character from the Supercell game Brawl Stars
 Beabadoobee, a Filipino-British singer-songwriter

Other uses
 Bea, Aragon, a municipality in the province of Teruel, Aragon, Spain
 Bail Enforcement Agent, a bounty hunter
 Bea or Aka-Bea language, an Asian extinct language
 Bile esculin agar, a growth medium
 BookExpo America, a major book fair in the United States

See also
 Beas (disambiguation)
 Beatrix (disambiguation)
 Beatrice (disambiguation)
 Bee (disambiguation)